Nathan Brewster Morse (November 14, 1799 – June 24, 1886) was an American lawyer and judge from New York.

Life 
Morse was born on November 14, 1799 in Canterbury, Connecticut, the son of Peter Morse and Lucinda Brewster.

Morse studied law with Ebenezer Young in Killingly, and after he was admitted to the Connecticut bar he practiced with Young for some time. In 1825, he moved to Brooklyn, New York and was quickly admitted to the bar there. After practicing law alone for two years, he formed the law firm Morse & Rockwell with William Rockwell in 1827. At the time, there were only 14 members of the Kings County bar, with Morse believed to be the last surviving of the 14.

In 1829, Morse became the Brooklyn city treasurer. In 1830, he was appointed Kings County District Attorney. In 1833, he was appointed first judge of the Court of Common Pleas of Kings County, an office he held until 1838. A year later, he was again appointed Kings County District Attorney. In 1847, he was elected to a six-year term for the New York Supreme Court Justice, Second District. He was also the first president of the Union Ferry Company, a position he held for forty years.

In 1827, Morse married Eliza Tiffany, sister of Charles Lewis Tiffany. Their children were Charlotte, Charles Henry, and Nathan Brewster. Eliza died in 1857. He later married widow Johanna S., mother of Elizabeth Richards Tilton.

Morse died at home on June 24, 1886. He was buried in Green-Wood Cemetery.

References

External links 

 Nathan B. Morse at Find a Grave

1799 births
1886 deaths
People from Canterbury, Connecticut
People from Killingly, Connecticut
Connecticut lawyers
Kings County District Attorneys
New York Supreme Court Justices
19th-century American lawyers
19th-century American judges
Burials at Green-Wood Cemetery